Acinetobacter bereziniae is a gram-negative, strictly aerobic bacterium from the genus Acinetobacter.

References

External links
Type strain of Acinetobacter bereziniae at BacDive - the Bacterial Diversity Metadatabase

Moraxellaceae
Bacteria described in 2010